Paris Centre is an administrative division of Paris encompassing the 1st, 2nd, 3rd and 4th arrondissements of the city.

In August 2016, ministers Jean-Michel Baylet, Bernard Cazeneuve and Estelle Grelier proposed reforms to the territorial division of Paris. The law was passed by the Senate in November and the National Assembly in February 2017. The reform grouped the first four arrondissements in political terms. Demographic changes meant that they had previously been overrepresented by over 20% in the city council in terms of population per seat, but the new entity had 101,764 inhabitants and eight seats, making it one seat per 12,720 inhabitants, 7% underrepresentation.

In October 2018, a postal referendum was held for the 66,791 registered voters in the territory, to choose a name. Paris Centre got 56.7% of the votes,  Cœur de Paris (Heart of Paris) 31.8%, Paris 1234 got 9% and Premiers arrondissements de Paris (First arrondissements of Paris) got 2.5%. When asked where the authorities should be headquartered, 50.7% chose the 3rd arrondissement's municipal hall over the 4th, with the other two being too small to be proposed.

Paris Centre was first involved in municipal elections in 2020. Ariel Weil of the Socialist Party (PS) was elected mayor, having been the last mayor of the 4th arrondissement.

See also
Arrondissements of Paris#History

References

2017 establishments in France